Robat Karim County is in Tehran province, Iran. The capital of the county is the city of Robat Karim. At the 2006 census, the county's population was 608,530 in 149,444 households. The following census in 2011 counted 195,917 people in 54,900 households, by which time Bostan and Golestan Districts had been separated from the county to become Baharestan County. At the 2016 census, the county's population was 291,516 in 89,271 households.

Administrative divisions

The population history and structural changes of Robat Karim County's administrative divisions over three consecutive censuses are shown in the following table. The latest census shows one district, three rural districts, and three cities.

References

 

Counties of Tehran Province